Christian Dominick Torres Palacios (born April 15, 2004) is a professional footballer who plays as a winger for Major League Soccer club Los Angeles FC. Born in the United States, he represented the Mexico national under-20 team.

Club career
Born in Fontana, California, Torres began his career with the LA Galaxy youth academy before joining rivals Los Angeles FC in 2018. During his first season with the club, Torres won the Golden Boot for the under-15's level, scoring 17 goals.

Los Angeles FC
On July 8, 2020, Torres signed a professional homegrown player contract with Major League Soccer side Los Angeles FC. He was signed alongside fellow Mexican-American teammates Erik Dueñas and Tony Leone and all three were the first three homegrown signings to come directly from the club's academy. Torres then made his competitive debut for the club on August 30, 2020 in a 3–1 defeat against Seattle Sounders FC. He came on as a 78th minute substitute for Brian Rodríguez.Torres made his first start on October 14, 2020 in a 2–1 loss to the Vancouver Whitecaps. His first professional goal came on October 18, 2020 in the 93rd minute for a 1–1 draw against the Portland Timbers. On November 24, 2020, Torres became the youngest player in MLS history to start in a playoff game at the age of 16 years 223 days. The previous record holder was Jozy Altidore, then of the New York Red Bulls, at the age of 16 years 349 days.

International career
Torres was called up to the Mexico U-20 team by Luis Ernesto Pérez to participate at the 2021 Revelations Cup, appearing in three matches, where Mexico won the competition. In June 2022, he was named into the final 20-man roster for the CONCACAF Under-20 Championship, in which Mexico failed to qualify for the FIFA U-20 World Cup and Olympics.

Career statistics

Club

Honours
Mexico U20
Revelations Cup: 2021, 2022

References

External links
Profile at the Los Angeles FC website

2004 births
Living people
People from Fontana, California
Soccer players from California
Sportspeople from San Bernardino County, California
Mexican footballers
Mexico under-20 international footballers
American soccer players
United States men's youth international soccer players
American sportspeople of Mexican descent
Association football forwards
Las Vegas Lights FC players
Los Angeles FC players
Major League Soccer players
USL Championship players